"Woh Ladki Hai Kahaan" is a 2001 song from the film Dil Chahta Hai, composed by Shankar–Ehsaan–Loy, performed by Shaan and Kavita Krishnamurthy and written by Javed Akhtar. The song stars Saif Ali Khan and Sonali Kulkarni.

Music
The track is frenzied Celtic music with bluegrass fiddling accustomed by Ehsaan's acoustic guitar riffs and flute. The song essentially launched singer Shaan's career, as it was the first hit of his career.

Music Video
The song is known for its comical picturization, where choreographer Farah Khan pays tribute to Bollywood, for the first time. The song spoofs the 60s, 70s and 80s of Hindi Cinema in a completely unique and funny way through the immensely peppy and the already-chartbuster song. The scene features Sameer played by Saif Ali Khan and Sonali Kulkarni who plays Pooja, going into a theater playing a musical, and sees themselves in screen instead. The song pays homage to the 60s, 70s and 80s as it progresses.

Awards

|-
| 2002
| Farah Khan
| Best Choreography
| Filmfare Awards
| 
|
|
|-
| 2002
| Farah Khan
| Best Choreography
| IIFA Awards
| 
|
|

See also
Dil Chahta Hai (soundtrack)
Shankar–Ehsaan–Loy

References

Songs with music by Shankar–Ehsaan–Loy
2001 singles
Indian songs
Hindi film songs
Songs with lyrics by Javed Akhtar
Shaan (singer) songs
Kavita Krishnamurthy songs
2001 songs